The 2012 United States presidential election in Rhode Island took place on November 6, 2012, as part of the 2012 United States presidential election in which all 50 states plus the District of Columbia participated. Rhode Island voters chose four electors to represent them in the Electoral College via a popular vote pitting incumbent Democratic President Barack Obama and his running mate, Vice President Joe Biden, against Republican challenger and former Massachusetts Governor Mitt Romney and his running mate, Congressman Paul Ryan.

Also on the ballot were Libertarian nominee, former New Mexico Governor Gary Johnson and his running mate, jurist Jim Gray. The left-wing Green Party nominated activist and physician Jill Stein and her running mate, anti-poverty advocate Cheri Honkala.

Rhode Island was won by Democratic nominee Obama by a 27.46% margin of victory. This was the seventh straight win for the Democratic Party in Rhode Island on the presidential level. It was also the seventh time in a row that the Democratic nominee for president won all 5 counties – a streak which would be broken when Donald Trump won Kent County in 2016 – and the sixth consecutive time that a Republican nominee failed to break 40% of the vote in the Ocean State. Rhode Island has been a safe Democratic state since 1988, and has only voted for a Republican nominee four times since 1928 (all of which in landslide elections). State politics are dominated by the Providence and Warwick metropolitan areas, and Providence County gave Obama his largest margin in the state at 34.92%. However, white working class voters in the inland and diverse, urban voters on the coast alike consistently vote Democratic, enough to provide the Democratic nominee with landslide margins in each election. This election is the most recent election that Rhode Island voted to the left of Massachusetts.

As of 2020, this was the last time the towns of Burrillville, Coventry, Exeter, Foster, Glocester, Hopkinton, Johnston, North Smithfield, and Smithfield voted for the Democratic candidate in a presidential election, and the last time East Greenwich voted for the Republican candidate in a presidential election.

Primary elections

Democratic primary
The 2012 Rhode Island Democratic primary was held April 24, 2012. Rhode Island awarded 40 delegates proportionally.

No candidate ran against incumbent President Barack Obama in Rhode Island's Democratic presidential preference primary. Obama received 6,759 votes, or 83.38% of the vote, with 1,133 uncommitted votes (13.98%) and 214 write-in votes (2.64%)

At the Rhode Island Democratic state convention held on June 21, 2012, 35 delegates were awarded to Barack Obama, with 5 delegates remaining unannounced.

Republican primary

The 2012 Rhode Island Republican presidential primary took place on April 24, 2012. Former Massachusetts Governor and frontrunner Mitt Romney received 63.02% of the vote, followed by U.S. Representative from Texas Ron Paul with 23.85% and former Speaker of the House Newt Gingrich with 6.04%. Former U.S. Senator from Pennsylvania Rick Santorum, who dropped out on April 10, received 5.66% of the vote.

General election

Results

Results by county

Results by congressional district
Obama won both congressional districts.

See also
 United States presidential elections in Rhode Island
 2012 Republican Party presidential debates and forums
 2012 Republican Party presidential primaries
 Results of the 2012 Republican Party presidential primaries
 Rhode Island Republican Party

References

External links
The Green Papers: for Rhode Island
The Green Papers: Major state elections in chronological order

2012
United States President
Rhode Island